Henri-Georges Clouzot is a French film director, writer and producer. He has contributed to many projects as either the writer, director, producer, or a combination of the three.

His first feature film was Tout pour l'amour (1933) and as a sole director the first was the 1942 mystery The Murderer Lives at Number 21, which featured Clouzot as both screenwriter and director. After the release of The Raven, Clouzot found himself barred from making movies until 1947. Clouzot was later embraced by international critics and audiences following the release of The Wages of Fear and Diabolique.

Clouzot's declining health interfered with his later work and made it necessary to abandon his production of L'Enfer. He released his final film La Prisonnière in 1966. L'Enfers script was filmed by Claude Chabrol in 1994.

Films

ReferencesGeneralSpecific'''

 Hayward, pp. 115–117
 Lloyd, p. 183

External links

Henri-Georges Clouzot at Rotten Tomatoes

Clouzot, Henri-Georges
Clouzot, Henri-Georges
Filmography